Michael Switzer (born May 27, 1948) is an American film and television director.

Some  of his credits in episodic television include M*A*S*H, Hill Street Blues, Quantum Leap, Fame (writer for one episode), Rags to Riches, Misfits of Science, JAG, NYPD Blue. He has also directed a number of television films.

His last directing crediting credit was the Prison Break episode "Selfless"in 2008.

References

External links

American television directors
Living people
People from Washington, D.C.
1948 births
Film directors from Washington, D.C.